Long-tailed antbird has been split into the following species:
 East Andean antbird, 	Drymophila caudata
 Klages's antbird, 	Drymophila klagesi
 Santa Marta antbird, 	Drymophila hellmayri
 Streak-headed antbird, 	  Drymophila striaticeps

Birds by common name